Pokrovka is a rural locality (a village) in Starosharashlinsky Selsoviet, Bakalinsky District, Bashkortostan, Russia. The population was 17 as of 2010. There are 2 streets.

Geography 
Pokrovka is located 5 km north of Bakaly (the district's administrative centre) by road. Verkhnetroitskoye is the nearest rural locality.

References 

Rural localities in Bakalinsky District